Konstantinos Botasis (born 1890, date of death unknown) was a Greek Olympic fencer. He competed at the 1928 and 1936 Summer Olympics.

References

1890 births
Year of death missing
Greek male fencers
Olympic fencers of Greece
Fencers at the 1928 Summer Olympics
Fencers at the 1936 Summer Olympics
Sportspeople from Athens